Magro is a surname. Notable people with the surname include:

Antonio Maria Magro (born 1959), Italian film director, actor and screenwriter
Daniele Magro (born 1987), Italian basketball player
Feliciano Magro (born 1979), Italian-Swiss footballer
Marc Magro (born 1984), American football player
Stan Magro (born 1954), Australian rules footballer
Sylvester Carmel Magro (born 1941), Maltese Roman Catholic bishop
Ronnie Ortiz-Magro (born 1985), American television personality and actor